Hillside Hospital may refer to:
 Hillside Hospital (Pulaski), Tennessee. Purchased & rebranded 2013.
 Zucker Hillside Hospital, Queens, NY, formerly Hillside Hospital.